The 2013 Music City Bowl was an American college football bowl game that was played on December 30, 2013, at LP Field in Nashville, Tennessee. The 16th edition of the Music City Bowl began at 2:15 p.m. CST and was broadcast on ESPN. It featured the Ole Miss Rebels from the Southeastern Conference against the Georgia Tech Yellow Jackets from the Atlantic Coast Conference. It was one of the 2013–14 bowl games that concluded the 2013 FBS football season.  The game was sponsored by the Franklin American Mortgage Company and was officially known as the Franklin American Mortgage Music City Bowl.  Ole Miss defeated Georgia Tech by a score of 25–17.

Teams
The two teams had met three times previously, with Georgia Tech holding a 2–1 lead and with each team winning a bowl game. In total bowl appearances, Ole Miss had a 22–12 record and Georgia Tech was 23–18.

Ole Miss

This season, Ole Miss set a new school record for yards in a season. Leading the team has been junior quarterback Bo Wallace, who is ranked 26th nationally in total offense (279.9 ypg) and in passing (257.5 ypg).

Georgia Tech

The Yellow Jackets have the 6th leading rushing attack with 311.7 yards per game. The team has scored 36.6 points per game, third best in the conference and 22nd nationally, and second-best in the program’s modern era. Senior DE Jeremiah Attaochu is leading the defense with a career 31 sacks, just shy of breaking the school’s career record. Offensively, the leader is senior A-back Robert Godhigh, recipient of the ACC’s 2013 Brian Piccolo Award, who has gained 1,114 yards from scrimmage (694 rush, 420 catch) and his average of 12.4 yards per play leads the FBS.

Game summary

Scoring summary

Statistics

References

Music City Bowl
Music City Bowl
Music City Bowl
Ole Miss Rebels football bowl games
Georgia Tech Yellow Jackets football bowl games
December 2013 sports events in the United States